The Aquarius Casino Resort (formerly Flamingo Hilton Laughlin and Flamingo Laughlin) is a hotel and casino located on the banks of the Colorado River in Laughlin, Nevada. It is owned and operated by Golden Entertainment and is the largest hotel in Laughlin.

Facilities
The Aquarius has two 18-floor towers with 1,907 rooms and suites that overlook the Colorado River. The property includes a business center, fitness center, pool and tennis courts. The Aquarius also has a tour boat, the Celebration, which takes visitors on a tour of the Colorado River area of Laughlin.

History

Flamingo Hilton Laughlin (1990–2000)

On August 1, 1990, the property opened as the Flamingo Hilton Laughlin.

Flamingo Laughlin (2000–2006)
In October 2000, the hotel's name was changed to the Flamingo Laughlin.

On November 29, 2005, Harrah's Entertainment announced plans to sell the resort to American Casino & Entertainment Properties (ACEP). The $170-million sale closed on May 19, 2006. ACEP was allowed to continue using the Flamingo name for up to six months after the sale.

Aquarius Casino Resort (2006–present)
The Flamingo Laughlin became the Aquarius Casino Resort on November 24, 2006.

In 2008, ACEP completed $54 million in  renovations at the Aquarius.

In October 2017, Golden Entertainment purchased ACEP, adding the Aquarius and three other casinos to its portfolio.

Entertainment
The Aquarius features entertainment appearing regularly in Splash Cabaret for free, and occasional stage shows and musical reviews in the Aquarius Pavilion.

References

External links
 
 

1990 establishments in Nevada
Casino hotels
Casinos completed in 1990
Casinos in Laughlin, Nevada
Golden Entertainment
Hotel buildings completed in 1990
Hotels established in 1990
Hotels in Laughlin, Nevada
Resorts in Laughlin, Nevada